The Adventures of Johnny Cash is the 68th album by American country singer Johnny Cash, released on Columbia Records in 1982 (see 1982 in music). "Georgia on a Fast Train" and "We Must Believe in Magic" were both released as singles with minor chart success: "Georgia on a Fast Train" got as high as #55 C&W while the latter peaked at a lowly #84 C&W.

Track listing 

Note: Track 5 was cut by Crystal Gayle five years prior to Cash's version.  Gayle's original version appears on the 1977 album of the same name.

Personnel 
Johnny Cash – vocals, acoustic guitar
Bob Wootton, Mike Elliot, Jerry Hensley, Jack Clement – guitar
Marty Stuart – guitar, mandolin, photography
John Hartford – fiddle, banjo
Joe Allen – bass
W.S. Holland, Kenny Malone – drums, percussion
Earl Poole Ball, Charles Cochran – piano, keyboards
Jack "Stack-a-Track" Grochmal – ukulele, engineer, mixing
The Mike Elliot String Quartet – Lennie Haight, Mark Feldman – violin, Kristin Wilkinson – viola, John Catchings – cello
June Carter Cash, Cindy Cash, Marty Stuart, Rachel Peer, Sandy Mason Theoret, Kathy Johnson, Joe Allen, Alan O'Bryant – backing vocals

Charts 
Singles - Billboard (United States)

External links 
 Luma Electronic's Johnny Cash discography listing

Johnny Cash albums
1982 albums
Albums produced by Jack Clement
Columbia Records albums